Stephen Strutt was the former governor of Mumbai during the British Raj. He assumed the office on 11 October 1715. He left office on 26 December 1715.

Governors of Bombay
Year of death unknown
Year of birth unknown